Aztec is a city in, and the county seat of, San Juan County, New Mexico, United States. The city population was 6,201 as of the 2020 census. The Aztec Ruins National Monument is located on the north side of the city.

Geography 
Aztec is located at  (36.8222261, -107.9928455).

Climate

Demographics 
Aztec is part of the Farmington, New Mexico Metropolitan Statistical Area.

2000 census
As of the census of 2000, there were 6,378 people, 2,330 households, and 1,589 families residing in the city. The population density was 253.1/km (655.7/mi). There were 2,545 housing units at an average density of 101.0/km (261.6/mi). The racial makeup of the city was 79.23% White, 0.38% African American, 9.31% Native American, 0.14% Asian, 0.13% Pacific Islander, 7.53% from other races, and 3.29% from two or more races. 19.22% of the population were Hispanic or Latino of any race.

There were 2,330 households, out of which 35.3% had children under the age of 18 living with them, 50.5% were married couples living together, 12.5% had a female householder with no husband present, and 31.8% were non-families. 27.6% of all households were made up of individuals, and 11.5% had someone living alone who was 65 years of age or older. The average household size was 2.51 and the average family size was 3.06.

In the city the population was spread out, with 26.6% under the age of 18, 10.7% from 18 to 24, 29.5% from 25 to 44, 20.2% from 45 to 64, and 13.0% who were 65 years of age or older. The median age was 34 years. For every 100 females, there were 104.6 males. For every 100 females age 18 and over, there were 101.1 males.

The median income for a household in the city was $33,110, and the median income for a family was $39,509. Males had a median income of $36,845 versus $17,841 for females. The per capita income for the city was $14,750. 17.4% of the population and 14.6% of families were below the poverty line. Out of the total people living in poverty, 20.6% were under the age of 18 and 15.7% were 65 or older.

Parks and recreation 
The City of Aztec has 10 parks for an approximate total of 132 acres.
Riverside Park (Community Park, 30.6 acre)
Tiger Park (Community Park, 18.9 acre)
Minium Park (Community Park 3.9 acre)
Hartman Park (Sports Complex 27.8 acre)
Cap Walls Park (Neighborhood Park 1.7 acre)
Florence Park (Neighborhood Park 2.7 acre)
Kokopelli Park (Neighborhood Park 0.6 acre)
Main Avenue Courtyard (Downtown Park 0.2 acre)
Swire-Townsend Refuge (Conservancy Area, 41.8 acre)
Rio Animas Park (Conservancy Area 3.8 acre)

In addition, there are over 16.5 miles (26.5 km) of trails established. Trail surfaces vary from concrete sidewalks to wood mulch, gravel and earthen construction.

Government 
The City of Aztec practices a commission-manager form of government as established in the New Mexico state statutes. The five commissioners are elected from each of the five districts. The mayor and mayor pro-tem are elected among the five commissioners.

Education 
Aztec Municipal Schools serves the City of Aztec and rural areas in northeastern San Juan County.

Infrastructure

Transportation

Air 

 General aviation service is available at the Aztec Municipal Airport.  The nearest commercial air service is at the Durango-La Plata County Airport, northeast of Aztec.

Highways 

 New Mexico Highway 516 is a southwest-northeast connector between Farmington and U.S. Highway 550 in Aztec.
U.S. Highway 550 runs north-south through Aztec.  It is one of the primary connectors from San Juan County to central New Mexico, Interstate 25, Albuquerque, and (via I-25) the capital city of Santa Fe.

Utliities

Water 

 Water comes from surface water sources, including the Aztec Ditch, Lower Animas Ditch, and the Animas River. The city maintains its own water treatment plant.

Electricity 

 Electricity is maintained by the Aztec Electric Department.  It has a compact electric system with 39 miles of distribution line. The city does not own any generation facilities; however, it does own a short segment of 69 kV transmission line within its service territory, and it receives all of its power through a single substation.  As of 2023, the city purchases all of its demand and energy requirements from a combination of contracts with the Western Area Power Association (WAPA) and the Public Service Company of New Mexico (PNM).

Tourism

Aztec Ruins National Monument 
Located within the city limits of Aztec, the Aztec Ruins National Monument is a UNESCO World Heritage site managed by the National Park Service. Visitors may take a self-guided tour through the ruins of the main roomblock and restored Great Kiva. The Ruins also offers special events and tours throughout the year.

Dinetah Pueblitos 

For the more remote and off the beaten path archaeological experience, the cultural buff can explore several canyon and mesa areas which were the ancestral homelands of the Navajo people. Navajo pueblitos (also known as Dinetah Pueblitos) refer to the defensive sites along canyon rims and outcrops that the Navajo people occupied in this region during the late 17th and early 18th centuries. Many of the sites are located on Bureau of Land Management lands and require four-wheel drive and high clearance vehicles to access. Roads are often not passable when wet.

Aztec Arches 

East and north of Aztec on public lands managed by the BLM are over 300 natural windows and arches. Many of these natural arches are small "windows", but there are a number of arches large enough to walk below. Over 26 canyons have been inventoried for arches and hoodoos.

Alien Run Mountain Bike Trail 
Mountain biking is very popular in San Juan County, New Mexico. Aztec has over 30 miles of trails of which the most popular is the Alien Run Trail. The trail is located on BLM lands and consists of a short loop (6.1 mi easy-moderate), long loop (additional 3.4 mi moderate) and the outer limits loop (6.7 mi difficult).

Angel Peak Scenic Area 

More public lands administered by the BLM, the Angel Peak Scenic Area offers a more colorful badlands and canyon landscape in contrast to the Bisti or Lybrook badlands. Three picnic areas and one campground with nine tent sites is available on a first-come, first-served basis.

Bisti /De-Na-Zin Wilderness 

The Bisti/De-Na-Zin Wilderness is public land managed by the BLM. Originally formed through the deposition of sediments from an ancient sea and river deltas millions of years ago, subsequent millions of years of erosion has carved out strange land forms, hoodoos and has exposed many petrified logs and stumps. It is also famous for several major dinosaur finds including "Spike" the Pentaceratops and "the Bisti Beast" a Bistahieversornow Tyrannosaur on display at the New Mexico Museum of Natural History and Science.

The western portion of this wilderness is known as the Bisti while the eastern portion is known as the De-Na-Zin. Each area offers slightly different geological deposits and land formations. Evening photography is the best as the sunsets provide a blazing palette of oranges and reds.

Ah-Shi-Sle-Pah Wilderness Study Area 

Similar to the Bisti, Ah-Shi-Sle-Pah Wilderness Study Area is located between the Bisti /De-Na-Zin Wilderness and Chaco Canyon. Also managed by the BLM, this area formed in similar fashion as the Bisti. However, this region has more multi-colored sandstone deposits, strange hoodoos, petrified wood, and dinosaur bones. One of the first Pentaceratops was collected from here by Charles Sternberg.

Lybrook Badlands 

Yet another area managed by the BLM, this area was formed about the same time as the Bisti and Ah-Shi-Sle-Pah. This region offers a uniquely different scale of landscape. Hoodoo in this region are massive and the terrain much greater in elevation differences, thereby exposing a greater geological time frame than the Bisti or Ah-Shi-Sle-Pah. This region is a bit more accessible due to oil field roads traversing the region. However, extreme caution is required when driving on as these roads as they are impassible when wet.

Notable people 
 Paul Bandy, member of the New Mexico House of Representatives
 Alex Kennedy, stock car racing driver
 Uma Krishnaswami, author of children's books
 T. Ryan Lane, attorney and member of the New Mexico House of Representatives
 Steven Neville, real estate appraiser and member of the New Mexico Senate
 Sandra Townsend, former member of the New Mexico House of Representatives

Gallery

See also 

 List of municipalities in New Mexico
 Aztec, New Mexico, UFO incident

References

External links 

 City of Aztec Government
 City of Aztec Visitor Center & Tourism
 Aztec Chamber of Commerce

Cities in New Mexico
Cities in San Juan County, New Mexico
County seats in New Mexico